Cullompton services is a motorway service station on the M5 motorway near Exeter. It is owned by Extra MSA. It has a McDonald's restaurant which is franchised and offers table service, a small WHSmith and a Costa Coffee which is owned by Moto Hospitality. There is also a Shell petrol station nearby.

Location
The services are situated on a narrow strip of land between the Bristol to Exeter railway line and the motorway at junction 28, and are accessible from the M5, A373 and B3181 roads. The junction at the southbound exit slip road is a very simple design with low traffic capacity. Unusually the service area is signed from the northbound carriageway but not from the southbound one, to reduce congestion at the low capacity service station, although it is readily accessible from both directions.

History
The site opened in 1999. A Little Chef used to operate at this location, but was closed in 2004.

In 2006 the service area was criticised by Which? magazine as being the worst in the country, but following a programme of improvements Cullompton was given a 3-star rating by VisitEngland in May 2012. The 2019 Motorway Services User Survey found that Cullompton was in the bottom five motorway services in the UK for customer satisfaction.

References

External links 
Motorway Services Online — Cullompton

Year of establishment missing
M5 motorway service stations
Buildings and structures in Devon
Transport in Devon
Extra motorway service stations
Cullompton